Justice Sir Harry Dias Bandaranaike (22 August 1822 - 24 June 1901) was a Ceylonese (Sri Lankan) barrister and judge. He was the first Sinhalese and native acting Chief Justice and Puisne Justice of the Supreme Court of Sri Lanka. He was an Unofficial Member of Legislative Council of Ceylon.

Born to Jacabus Dias Wijewardena Bandaranaike, Mudaliyar of Governor Gate and translator of the Supreme Court of Ceylon. His brothers include John Charles Dias Bandaranaike and the Rev Canon Samuel William Dias Bandaranaike. He became the first Ceylonese Barrister when he was called to the bar at Middle Temple in 1848.

Having returned to Ceylon, he began his legal practice as an Advocate of the Supreme Court and served as a Member of Legislative Council from 1861 to 1864. In 1885 he was appointed as the first Sinhalese Judge of the Supreme Court, a post he held till 1892, during which he served as acting Chief Justice in 1888. He was Knighted in the 1893 Birthday Honours and represented Ceylon at the Diamond Jubilee of Queen Victoria in 1896.

References

Citations

Bibliography

External links
 Bandaranaike family tree
 Living in Maha Nuge Gardens in Colombo Sri Lanka

1822 births
1901 deaths
Sinhalese lawyers
Alumni of Royal College, Colombo
Alumni of King's College London
Members of the Middle Temple
Puisne Justices of the Supreme Court of Ceylon
Sinhalese judges
Sri Lankan barristers
Ceylonese Knights Bachelor
Harry
20th-century Sri Lankan lawyers
19th-century Sri Lankan lawyers